Agonopterix cynarivora is a moth in the family Depressariidae. It was described by Edward Meyrick in 1932. It is found in Morocco.

References

Moths described in 1932
Agonopterix
Moths of Africa